Tim Henman was the defending champion, but lost in the final to Karol Kučera 7–5, 6–4.

Seeds

Draw

Finals

Top half

Bottom half

References

 Main Draw

Sydney International
Men's Singles